Richard Cornthwaite Lambert (5 May 1868 – 5 November 1939) was a British barrister and Liberal Party politician

Early life 
The son of the Reverend Richard U Lambert, vicar of Christ Church, Bradford on Avon, Somerset and his wife Agnes née Stanton, he was educated at Shrewsbury School and Trinity College, Cambridge, graduating with honours in history.

He travelled widely in Europe and the Middle East before being called to the bar at the Inner Temple in 1892. He practised law on the Midland Circuit. In 1893 he married Lilian Burman of Four Oaks, Warwickshire, with whom he had 3 children. One of his sons was Richard S. Lambert, who was to become editor of The Listener.

Political career 
He joined the Liberal Party. He sat on the Executive Committee of the London Liberal Federation. He stood as a Liberal candidate at Sheffield Ecclesall in 1906, at Sheffield Attercliffe at a by-election in 1909, and Portsmouth in January 1910.

In 1907 he attempted to win a London County Council seat at West Islington for the Liberal-backed Progressive Party but was unsuccessful. However, in March 1910 he was elected to the London County Council at the second attempt;

He was elected to the House of Commons as Member of Parliament (MP) for Cricklade at the general election in December 1910,

In 1913 he stood down from the London County Council. He was a pacifist. During the Great War he opposed the introduction of conscription into the armed services. He joined the Union of Democratic Control, a group of Liberal and Labour MPs who opposed military influence in government. In 1917 he wrote and had published 'The Parliamentary History of Conscription in Great Britain'. In 1918 he joined the Labour Party.
The Cricklade constituency was abolished at the 1918 general election, and Lambert did not stand for Parliament again.

In 1922 he became librarian at the Athenaeum Club, London, holding the post until 1935.

Election results

References

External links 
 

1868 births
1939 deaths
Alumni of Trinity College, Cambridge
Labour Party (UK) politicians
Liberal Party (UK) MPs for English constituencies
Members of the Inner Temple
Members of London County Council
Members of the Parliament of the United Kingdom for Cricklade
People educated at Shrewsbury School
Progressive Party (London) politicians
UK MPs 1910–1918